Statistics of Third Division Football Tournament in the 2012 season. According to the FAM Calendar 2012, Third Division Football Tournament will start on October 15.

Teams
43 teams are competition in the 2012 Third Division Football Tournament, and these teams were divided into 14 groups.

Group 1
Kelaa Naalhi Sports
Zeal Sports Club
Vaikaradhoo Football Club

Group 2
MS Helping Hand Sports
L.Q. Sports Club
Kodey Sports Club

Group 3
Sports Club Henveyru Dhekunu
Society for Alifushi Youth
Club Green Streets

Group 4
Our Recreation Club
Club New Oceans
Rakeedhoo Ijuthimaaee Gulhun

Group 5
Sealand
Kudahuvadhoo Sports Club
Teenage Juniors

Group 6
Kuda Henveiru United
Tent Sports Club
Buru Sports Club

Group 7
Club Amigos
Club PK
S.T.E.L.C.O. Recreation Club

Group 8
Hilaaly New Generation
Ilhaar
The Bows Sports Club

Group 9
West Sports Club
Falcon Sports Club
Youth Revolution Club

Group 10
Fiyoree Sports Club
Offu Football Club
Club O1O

Group 11
Maaenboodhoo Zuvaanunge Jamiyyaa
TC Sports Club
Mahibadhoo Sports Club

Group 12
Iramaa Youth Association
Sports Club Velloxia
Veyliant Sports Club

Group 13
Lorenzo Sports Club
Veyru Sports Club
Sent Sports Club

Group 14
Naivaadhoo Trainers Sports Club
Lagoons Sports Club
Sports Club Rivalsa
Muiveyo Friends Club

Group stage

Group 1

Group 2

Group 3

Group 4

Group 5

Group 6

Group 7

Group 8

Group 9

Group 10

Group 11

Group 12

Group 13

Group 14

Ranking of second-placed teams

Second round

Quarter-finals

Semi-finals

Final

Awards

External links
 Mahibadhoo and Green Street to play in the final (DHIVEHI) at Haveeru Online
 Mahibadhoo claims champion (DHIVEHI) at Haveeru Online
 Mahibadhoo & Sent to Semis (DHIVEHI) at Haveeru Online
 ORC & Green Street to semis (DHIVEHI) at Haveeru Online

References

Maldivian Third Division Football Tournament seasons
3